The 1983 Head Cup was a women's tennis tournament played on outdoor clay courts in Kitzbuhel, Austria that was part of the 1983 Virginia Slims World Championship Series. The tournament was held from 18 July through 24 July 1983.

Finals

Singles
 Pascale Paradis defeated  Petra Huber 3–6, 6–3, 6–2
 It was Paradis' 1st singles career title.

Doubles
 Chris Newton /  Pam Whytcross defeated  Nathalie Herreman /  Pascale Paradis 2–6, 6–4, 7–6
 It was Newton's only career title. It was Whytcross' 1st career title.

Head Cup
WTA Austrian Open
WTA
Head